Metacrambus pallidellus is a species of moth in the family Crambidae described by Philogène Auguste Joseph Duponchel in 1836. It is found in France, Italy, Spain and Portugal, as well as North Africa, including Morocco, Algeria and Tunisia.

References

Moths described in 1836
Crambinae
Moths of Europe